Matt King (born September 28, 1966) is an American country singer-songwriter. King was born and raised in Asheville, North Carolina. His mother, a real estate agent, played piano, and his father, a 2018 Inductee into the National Auctioneers Association Hall of Fame who held jobs as an auctioneer, mason, and barber, played bluegrass guitar. Early in his career he was offered a position at Opryland USA after an audition. However, he was deep in debt at the time and had to turn down the offer because he could not afford to move. Some time later, in 1994, he relocated to Nashville, where he recorded demos and played locally. Producer Gary Morris heard him perform and got him an audition with Atlantic Records, who signed him and released his debut in 1997. Soon after he performed at the Grand Ole Opry in a Johnny Russell tribute, with Earl Scruggs, Roy Clark, Ricky Skaggs, and Vince Gill.

Discography

Albums

Singles

Music videos

References

External links
 

American male singer-songwriters
American country singer-songwriters
Singer-songwriters from North Carolina
Living people
1966 births
Atlantic Records artists
Montage Music Group artists
Country musicians from North Carolina